is the eponymous album by the Japanese singer-songwriter Miyuki Nakajima, released in March 1988.

Her 15th studio album features two songs released as a single, "Gokigen Ikaga" and "Kamen". The former was used in the Japanese Ministry of Posts and Telecommunications' TV ad starring by Nakajima, aired c. 1995. The latter was co-written by Yoshihiro Kai, a frontman of the Kai Band.

Track listing
All songs written and composed by Miyuki Nakajima, unless otherwise noted.

Side one
All songs arranged by Kazuo Shiina (except "Doro wa Furishikiru" arranged by Joe Hisaishi)
""  – 6:31
"" – 4:14
"" – 4:29
"" – 4:11
"" – 5:00

Side two
All songs arranged by Kazuo Shiina (except "Cleansing Cream" arranged by Joe Hisaishi)
"" – 7:31
"" (Nakajima, Yoshihiro Kai) - 5:34
"" – 6:50
"" – 4:35

Personnel
Kōki Itō - bass guitar
Hitoshi Watanabe - bass guitar
Chūei Yoshikawa - acoustic guitar
Kenji Kitajima - electric guitar
Hideo Saito - electric guitar
Takayuki Hijikata - electric guitar
Kazuo Shiina - electric guitar, synthesizer 
Joe Hisaishi - synthesizer
Yasuharu Nakanishi - piano
Katsuhiko Kamizuna - hammond organ
Jake H Conception - saxophone
Jun Aoyama - drums
Motoya Hamaguchi - percussion
Kazuyo Sugimoto - backing vocals
Yuiko Tsubokura - backing vocals
Eve - backing vocals
Kazuhito Murata - backing vocals
Keisuke Yamamoto - backing vocals
Joey McCoy - backing vocals
Michael Wilson - backing vocals
Miyuki Nakajima - lead vocal, backing vocals
Keiji Azami - dulcimer
Takashi Asahi - quena
Aska Kaneko Group - strings
Yūichi Tomaru - computer programming
Yukari Hashimoto - computer programming

Production
Producer and Arranger: Kazuo Shiina
Arranger: Joe Hisaishi (on "Doro wa Furishikiru" and "Cleansing Cream")
Composer, Lyricist, Producer and Performer: Miyuki Nakajima (occasionally credit to "miss M" in association with Airando)
Mixing Engineer: Larry Alexander
Digitally mastering: Ted Jensen (at the Stering Sound, NYC)
Engineer: Yasuo Satō, Takeshi Itō, Hiroshi "Pin" Satō, Masayoshi Ohkawa, Keishi Ikeda, Shun'ichi Yokoyama
Assistant Engineer: Steve Boyer, Masato Tobisawa, Tōru Okitsu, Kazuyoshi Inoue, Hiroki Iijima, Tsuneharu Manda
Photographer and Art Director: Jin Tamura
Designer: Hirofumi Arai
Visual Coordinator: Norio Murai, Meg Maruyama
Music Coordinator: Takashi Kimura, Fumio Miyata
Production Coordinator: Shizu Orishige
Disc Promotor: Yoshio Kan, Seiki Ishikawa, Tsuyoshi Yamauchi
Artist Management: Kohji Suzuki, Mizuho "Sranky" Shirato
General Management: Takahiro "Woody" Uno
A&R: Yūzō Watanabe
Special Advice: Yoshihiro Kai
DAD: Genichi Kawakami

Charts

Release history

Miyuki Nakajima albums
1988 albums
Pony Canyon albums